The Conspiracy Files is a British documentary television series broadcast on BBC Two, investigating various modern-day conspiracy theories. So far in two series and 13 programmes, the show has investigated the theories surrounding the September 11 attacks (twice), the Pan Am Flight 103 bomb, the Oklahoma City bombing, the 7 July 2005 London bombings, the deaths of David Kelly and Diana, Princess of Wales, Malaysia Airlines Flight 17, and those perpetrated by Donald Trump.

Episodes

References

External links
 BBC Two The Conspiracy Files

2006 British television series debuts
2018 British television series endings
2000s British documentary television series
2010s British documentary television series
English-language television shows
Television series about conspiracy theories